Jacques Kruyswijk (born 16 October 1992) is a South African professional golfer who plays on the European Tour and Sunshine Tour. He won the 2016 Cape Town Open.

Amateur career
Kruyswijk enjoyed a stellar career as an amateur and won the Royal Silver Vase in 2011.

He represented Limpopo Province between 2005 and 2012. In 2011 he was nominated as the SA IPT Player of the Year. He recorded six victories on the IGT Tour.

Professional career
Kruyswijk turned professional in January 2013 after he finished 7th in the 	2013 Sunshine Tour Q-School. He recorded his first professional victory in his rookie season in an event on the Big Easy Tour. In 2015 he received attention at a Vodacom Origins of Golf event when he got a one shot penalty after whacking his ball off a tree then into his most sensitive area.

On the 2016–17 Sunshine Tour he won the Lion of Africa Cape Town Open in November and tied for 4th at the Joburg Open in February. He finished 11th on the Order of Merit. On the 2017–18 Sunshine Tour he tied for 4th at the South African Open and again finished 11th on the Order of Merit.

Kruyswijk joined the European Tour in 2017 after finishing tied second among the 2017 European Tour Qualifying School graduates.

In 2020, his best results were 3rd-place finishes at the Eye of Africa PGA Championship and Limpopo Championship.

In 2021, Kruyswijk recorded five top-10s on the European Tour and finished in 116th place on the Order of Merit, retaining his card. He also recorded his second Sunshine Tour victory when he won the Sunshine Tour Invitational held at his home club, the Centurion Country Club. He broke into the top-200 on the Official World Golf Ranking for the first time following this win.

Professional wins (9)

Sunshine Tour wins (2)

Big Easy Tour wins (1)

IGT Pro Tour wins (6)

See also
2017 European Tour Qualifying School graduates

References

External links

South African male golfers
European Tour golfers
Sunshine Tour golfers
Sportspeople from Pretoria
1992 births
Living people